Arjen Gerald Teeuwissen (born March 29, 1971) is an equestrian from the Netherlands, who won the silver medal in the Team Dressage event at the 2000 Summer Olympics in Sydney, Australia. He did so alongside Anky van Grunsven, Ellen Bontje, and Coby van Baalen.

Teeuwissen was one of eight LGBT Olympians, who were also equestrians at the 2000 Olympic Games. At the medal ceremony of the team dressage, the three men of the twelve who were awarded medals were all gay men, Robert Dover and Guenter Seidel (both USA, bronze) and Teeuwissen.

References

External links
 Dutch Olympic Committee

1971 births
Gay sportsmen
Living people
Dutch dressage riders
Equestrians at the 2000 Summer Olympics
Olympic equestrians of the Netherlands
Dutch male equestrians
Olympic medalists in equestrian
Olympic silver medalists for the Netherlands
Dutch LGBT sportspeople
LGBT equestrians
People from Mook en Middelaar
Medalists at the 2000 Summer Olympics
Sportspeople from Limburg (Netherlands)
21st-century Dutch LGBT people